Temnophliantidae is a family of crustaceans belonging to the order Amphipoda.

Genera:
 Hystriphlias Barnard & Karaman, 1987
 Temnophlias Barnard, 1916

References

Amphipoda